Christopher Alexander Luis Casillas von Uckermann (born 21 October 1986) is a Mexican singer, songwriter and actor.  

He started his acting career when he was only two years old in TV commercials, and became known worldwide after his roles as Diego Bustamante in the soap opera Rebelde and Father Ramiro Ventura in the supernatural horror web series Diablero.  

He was a member of the band RBD from 2004 to 2009 and has been a solo artist since the band's split, having released one album, Somos, in 2010, and two EPs, La Revolución de los Ciegos in 2017 and Sutil Universo in 2020.

Acting career
In 1999 he was cast in El diario de Daniela. He then starred in Amigos X Siempre in 2000, alongside Spanish Mexican singer/actress Belinda Peregrín. In 2001 he acted in and wrote the theme song for the series Aventuras En El Tiempo.

In 2004 he was cast in Rebelde, a remake of the famed Argentinean series, Rebelde Way. He played Diego Bustamante, a student in the fictitious Elite Way School, with dreams of becoming a musician. The show ran from 2004–2006, totaling 440 episodes.

Following the success of Rebelde, in 2007, Televisa released RBD: La Familia, which starred the members of RBD.  The sitcom was based on the fictional lives of the members of RBD. The characters of the series were not based on the band's characters in Rebelde, but intended to be similar to the actors' real personalities. The show ran from March 14, 2007 – June 13, 2007, and only lasted 13 episodes.

He starred in the hit TV series of mystery and science fiction Kdabra, produced in Latin America by Fox. The series is filmed in Colombia at the Majestic Hotel. Already airing throughout Central and South America, eastern Europe and Japan.  Series was shown in the United States on the now defunct MundoFox network, an attempt by Colombia's RCN Network and Fox International Channels which aired between 2012 and 2015.

Since 2018, he is starring in the Mexican television web series Diablero as the father Ramiro Ventura.

Music career
The success of Rebelde, launched RBD. To date RBD has made 9 studio albums, including records in Spanish, Portuguese and English. They have sold over 20 million albums worldwide, and have toured across Mexico, South America, Serbia, Romania, Slovenia, the United States, and Spain.

Uckermann composed "Sueles Volver", for RBD's fourth Spanish language album, Empezar Desde Cero.

On 15 August 2008, RBD released a message telling fans that they had decided to split up. They went on one final tour, Gira Del Adios World Tour which ended in early 2009.

In February 2009, Uckermann announced that he would be releasing a new song as a solo artist, produced by Rudy Maya.  The song, entitled "Light Up the World Tonight", was officially released on iTunes in March 2009.

Uckermann recorded his debut solo album "SOMOS" in several cities throughout the world.  The album was released November 2010 and sold well throughout the US, Mexico and Brazil.  In February 2012 Uckermann released an English language single entitled "Million Dollar Man".  Uckermann is currently recording his follow up solo album in Los Angeles, Mexico, New York, Stockholm, Rio de Janeiro and London and is planning a US tour in September–October 2012 in conjunction with the release of his new album.

In 2017, Uckermann announced the release of a new project, an EP called La Revolución de los Ciegos ("revolution of the blind"). To promote the album, he went on tour in Brazil, and released his new songs on his YouTube channel in August.

Discography

Studio albums
 2010: Somos

EP
 2017: La Revolución De Los Ciegos
 2020: Sutil Universo

Singles
 2010: "Sinfonía" (music video)
 2011: "Apaga La Máquina"
 2011: "Right Now"
 2012: "Million Dollar Man"
 2013: "Sueño Surreal"
 2021: "Heal Together"

Promo singles
 2008: "Light up the World" (live music video)
 2009: "Vivir Soñando" (music video)
 2010: "Viver Sonhando"
 2011: "Supernova"
 2011: "Nos Van a Escuchar"

Tours
 2009: El Movimiento (Pocket Show)
 2010: ShowCase Kdabra (world tour series "Kdabra")
 2011: Somos World Tour
 2019-present: Sutil Universo

Discography with RBD

External links

1986 births
Living people
Mexican male child actors
Mexican drummers
Mexican male musicians
Male drummers
Mexican male singers
Mexican pop singers
Mexican songwriters
Male songwriters
Mexican people of Swedish descent
Mexican people of German descent
Male actors from Mexico City
Singers from Mexico City
RBD members
Portuguese-language singers of Mexico
Mexican male television actors
21st-century drummers